Théo Zidane Fernández (born 18 May 2002) is a French professional footballer who plays as a midfielder for Real Madrid Castilla.

Early life 
Théo Zidane was born on 18 May 2002 in Marseille. He is the third son of former French footballer Zinedine Zidane. He has 3 brothers, Enzo, Luca, and Elyaz who are all professional footballers.

Club career 
Zidane is a youth product of Canillas, and moved to the youth academy of Real Madrid in 2010. He started playing with the Real Madrid B in September 2020. He started training with Real Madrid's first team in February 2021 when his father was the manager of the club.

International career
Zidane was born in France, and is of Algerian and Spanish descent. He is a youth international for France, having represented the France U16s, U17s, and U20s. He represented the France U17s at the 2019 UEFA European Under-17 Championship.

Style of play
A midfielder like his father, Zidane is a great finisher and has a varied repertoire in the box. He is a goalscorer, and known for his speed.

Career statistics

Club

Honours
Real Madrid Juvenil A
UEFA Youth League: 2019–20

References

External links
FFF profile
Real Madrid profile

2002 births
Living people
Footballers from Marseille
French footballers
France youth international footballers
French sportspeople of Algerian descent
French people of Spanish descent
Association football midfielders
Real Madrid Castilla footballers
Primera Federación players
Segunda División B players